Paella Today! is a 2017 Spanish comedy by César Sabater.

Plot 

Two friends, Pep and Vicent, live in a wide flat in Valencia. Both Pep, an artist, and Vicent, a tourist guide, meet Lola, an old acquaintance of Pep's, with whom both become infatuated. After Lola has sex with both of them separately, they decide to have a threesome, which generates a conflict among all three and causes Pep and Vicent to fall out.

Cast

Reception 

The movie was panned by critics. Critic Mikel Zorrilla stated that it is "a very bad movie in which none of its subplots actually work" and "an overdose of tasteless clichés".

References

External links
 
 

2017 films
Spanish comedy films
Films shot in Valencia
Films shot in Spain
2017 comedy films